Victor Omagbemi (born 22 May 1967) is a retired Nigerian sprinter. He won both the 100 and 200 metres at the 1992 African Championships.

Omagbemi finished fourth in 4 x 100 metres relay at the 1991 World Championships with teammates George Ogbeide, Olapade Adeniken and Davidson Ezinwa.

He is married to Mary Onyali-Omagbemi.

External links

1967 births
Living people
Nigerian male sprinters